Pirmasens is an electoral constituency (German: Wahlkreis) represented in the Bundestag. It elects one member via first-past-the-post voting. Under the current constituency numbering system, it is designated as constituency 210. It is located in southern Rhineland-Palatinate, comprising the cities of Pirmasens and Zweibrücken, the Südwestpfalz district, and the southwestern part of the Landkreis Kaiserslautern district.

Pirmasens was created for the inaugural 1949 federal election. Since 2021, it has been represented by Angelika Glöckner of the Social Democratic Party (SPD).

Geography
Pirmasens is located in southern Rhineland-Palatinate. As of the 2021 federal election, it comprises the independent cities of Pirmasens and Zweibrücken, the district of Südwestpfalz, and the Verbandsgemeinden of Bruchmühlbach-Miesau, Landstuhl, and Ramstein-Miesenbach from the Landkreis Kaiserslautern district.

History
Pirmasens was created in 1949, then known as Zweibrücken. It acquired its current name in the 1965 election. In the 1949 election, it was Rhineland-Palatinate constituency 14 in the numbering system. In the 1953 through 1961 elections, it was number 161. In the 1965 through 1976 elections, it was number 162. In the 1980 through 1998 elections, it was number 160. In the 2002 election, it was number 213. In the 2005 election, it was number 212. In the 2009 and 2013 elections, it was number 211. Since the 2017 election, it has been number 210.

Originally, the constituency comprised the cities of Pirmasens and Zweibrücken and the districts of Landkreis Pirmasens, Landkreis Zweibrücken, and Bergzabern. In the 1965 and 1969 elections, it comprised the cities of Pirmasens and Zweibrücken and the districts of Landkreis Pirmasens and Landkreis Zweibrücken. In the 1972 through 1998 elections, it comprised the cities of Pirmasens and Zweibrücken and the Landkreis Pirmasens district. It acquired its current borders in the 2002 election.

Members
The constituency has been held by the Christian Democratic Union (CDU) during all but one Bundestag term since its creation. It was first represented by Josef Becker from 1949 to 1972. Werner Marx served from 1972 to 1987, followed by Klaus-Dieter Uelhoff until 1998. Lydia Westrich of the Social Democratic Party (SPD) was elected in 1998 and served a single term. Anita Schäfer was elected in 2002, and re-elected in 2005, 2009, 2013, and 2017. Angelika Glöckner won the constituency for the SPD in 2021.

Election results

2021 election

2017 election

2013 election

2009 election

Notes

References

Federal electoral districts in Rhineland-Palatinate
1949 establishments in West Germany
Constituencies established in 1949
Pirmasens
Zweibrücken
Südwestpfalz
Kaiserslautern (district)